= Padagha =

Padagha Padghe पडघे
- Census town
- Location in Maharashtra, India
- Coordinates: 19.3667°N 73.1833°E
- Country: India
- State: Maharashtra
- District: Thane

Population (2001)
  - Total: 5,056

Languages
  - Official: Marathi
- Time zone: UTC+5:30 (IST)

Padagha is a census town in Thane district in the Indian state of Maharashtra.

== Demographics ==
As of 2001 India census, Padagha had a population of 5056. Males constitute 52% of the population and females 48%. Padagha has an average literacy rate of 79%, higher than the national average of 59.5%: male literacy is 82%, and female literacy is 75%. In Padagha, 12% of the population is under 6 years of age.
